is a Japanese judoka. She competed at the 2020 Summer Olympics, winning a silver medal in mixed team.

Career
She started judo at the age of 8. Her favorite techniques are Uchi mata and Ōuchi gari.

In 2009, she won the gold medal in the 63 kg weight class at the World Judo Championships Cadet. In 2010, she won the gold medal in the 63 kg weight class at the Youth Olympics and the World Judo Championships Junior.

In 2011, she suffered an anterior cruciate ligament injury at the Kinshuki High School Judo Tournament.  The next year she returned to the tatami after long rehabilitation。

In 2013, she took a position at Komatsu Limited after graduating from Shukutoku High School.

She won the bronze medal in the Extra-lightweight (63 kg) division at the 2014 World Judo Championships.

In November 2022, she married Kengo Takaichi, a judoka and former Japanese men's national team player.

As a result, her registered name was changed to "Miku Takaichi", and she participated in the tournament as Miku Takaichi from the Grand Slam Tokyo in December, and won the women's 63 kg class.

References

External links
 
 
 

1994 births
Living people
Japanese female judoka
Judoka at the 2010 Summer Youth Olympics
Komatsu Limited
Judoka at the 2016 Summer Olympics
Olympic judoka of Japan
Sportspeople from Tokyo
Youth Olympic gold medalists for Japan
Judoka at the 2020 Summer Olympics
Olympic medalists in judo
Olympic silver medalists for Japan
Medalists at the 2020 Summer Olympics
21st-century Japanese women